Charles Wigram Long (1842 – 13 December 1911) was a British Conservative Party politician. He sat in the House of Commons for 1895 to 1910.

Biography
Long was the son of Charles Long, who was Archdeacon of the East Riding of Yorkshire, and his wife Anna Maria, the daughter of Sir Robert Wigram, 1st Baronet.
He entered the Royal Artillery in 1860, becoming a captain in 1874, a brevet major in 1881, and a lieutenant-colonel (retired) in 1886.
He later became a justice of the peace and a deputy lieutenant of Worcestershire.

He was elected at the 1895 general election as the Member of Parliament (MP) for the Evesham division of Worcestershire, and held the seat until he stood down at the January 1910 general election.

Family 
In 1889 Long married Constance Vansittart, daughter of Lieutenant-Colonel Robert Vansittart of the Coldstream Guards.

References

External links 
 

1842 births
1911 deaths
Conservative Party (UK) MPs for English constituencies
UK MPs 1895–1900
UK MPs 1900–1906
UK MPs 1906–1910
Royal Artillery officers
Deputy Lieutenants of Worcestershire